Merthyr Tydfil and Rhymney is a constituency represented in the House of Commons of the UK Parliament since 2015 by Gerald Jones of the Welsh Labour Party. It was established for the 1983 general election.

Boundaries

1983–1997: The Borough of Merthyr Tydfil, and the District of Rhymney Valley wards Nos. 5 and 14 to 20.

1997–2010: The County Borough of Merthyr Tydfil, and the Caerphilly County Borough wards of Abertysswg, Darren Valley, Moriah, New Tredegar, Pontlottyn, Tir-Phil, and Twyn Carno.

2010–present: The Merthyr Tydfil County Borough electoral divisions of Bedlinog, Cyfarthfa, Dowlais, Gurnos, Merthyr Vale, Park, Penydarren, Plymouth, Town, Treharris, and Vaynor, and the Caerphilly County Borough electoral divisions of Darran Valley, Moriah, New Tredegar, Pontlottyn, and Twyn Carno.

As its name suggests, the main towns are Merthyr Tydfil and Rhymney. Aberfan is also located in the constituency. The seat is bordered by the constituencies of Blaenau Gwent, Brecon and Radnorshire, Caerphilly, Cynon Valley, and Islwyn.

History
The constituency was created for the 1983 general election, prior to this Merthyr Tydfil had been in its own eponymous constituency and Rhymney was in the seat of Ebbw Vale (at the time Michael Foot's constituency) which was abolished at that election.

Members of Parliament

Elections

Elections in the 1980s

Elections in the 1990s

Elections in the 2000s

Elections in the 2010s

 

Of the 80 rejected ballots:
22 were either unmarked or it was uncertain who the vote was for.
57 voted for more than one candidate.
1 had writing or mark by which the voter could be identified.

 

Of the 95 rejected ballots:
49 were either unmarked or it was uncertain who the vote was for.
46 voted for more than one candidate.

Of the 71 rejected ballots:
41 were either unmarked or it was uncertain who the vote was for.
30 voted for more than one candidate.

Of the 83 rejected ballots:
23 voted for more than one candidate.
4 had writing or mark by which the voter could be identified.
56 had want of official mark.

See also
 Merthyr Tydfil and Rhymney (Senedd constituency) 
 List of parliamentary constituencies in Mid Glamorgan
 List of parliamentary constituencies in Wales

Notes

References

External links
Politics Resources (Election results from 1922 onwards)
Electoral Calculus (Election results from 1955 onwards)
2017 Election House Of Commons Library 2017 Election report
A Vision Of Britain Through Time (Constituency elector numbers)

Parliamentary constituencies in South Wales
Constituencies of the Parliament of the United Kingdom established in 1983
Mid Glamorgan
Politics of Merthyr Tydfil County Borough
Politics of Caerphilly County Borough